Operation Battleaxe (15–17 June 1941) was a British Army offensive during the Second World War to raise the Siege of Tobruk and re-capture eastern Cyrenaica from German and Italian forces. The offensive's failure led to the replacement of British General Sir Archibald Wavell, Commander-in-Chief Middle East, by Claude Auchinleck; Wavell took Auchinleck's position as Commander-in-Chief, India.

British and Commonwealth Forces

Commander in Chief, Middle East
General Archibald Wavell

 XIII Corps
 Lieutenant-General Noel Beresford-Peirse
  7th Armoured Division
 Major-General Michael O'Moore Creagh
 4th Armoured Brigade (Brigadier Alexander Gatehouse)
 4th Royal Tank Regiment (Matilda tanks) (Lieutenant-Colonel Walter O'Carroll)
 7th Royal Tank Regiment (Matilda tanks) (Lieutenant-Colonel Basil Groves)
 7th Armoured Brigade (Brigadier Hugh Russell)
 2nd Royal Tank Regiment (Mk I, II and III/IV Cruiser tanks)
 6th Royal Tank Regiment (Crusader tanks) (Lieutenant-Colonel Leonard Harland)
 7th Support Group (Brigadier John Campbell)
 1st, 3rd, 4th, and 106th Regiments Royal Horse Artillery
 1st battalion, King's Royal Rifle Corps
 2nd battalion, Rifle Brigade
 Divisional troops
 11th Hussars (Reconnaissance regiment) (Lieutenant-Colonel William Leetham)
 Engineers
 4th Field Squadron, RE
 143rd Field Park Squadron, RE
  4th Indian Infantry Division
 Major-General Frank Messervy
 11th Indian Infantry Brigade 
 Brigadier Reginald Savory
 2nd battalion, Queen's Own Cameron Highlanders
 1st battalion, 6th Rajputana Rifles
 2nd battalion, 5th Mahratta Light Infantry
 22nd Guards Brigade 
 Brigadier Ian Erskine
 1st battalion, Buffs (Royal East Kent Regiment)
 2nd battalion, Scots Guards
 3rd battalion, Coldstream Guards
 22nd Guards Brigade Attack Company
 Divisional troops
 Central India Horse (Reconnaissance regiment)
 25th Field Regiment, RA
 31st Field Regiment, RA
 Engineers
 4th, 12th, 18th, and 21st Field Company (sappers and miners)
 11th Field Park Company

German and Italian forces

Comandante SuperioreGenerale d'Armata Italo Gariboldi
 Deutsches Afrika Korps
 Generalleutnant Erwin Rommel
  15th Panzer Division
 Generalleutnant Walter Neumann-Silkow
 8th Panzer Regiment (Oberstleutnant Hans Cramer)
 1st Battalion (Hauptmann Johannes Kümmel)
 2nd Battalion 
 1st Battalion of the 104th Motor Infantry Regiment (Wilhelm Bach)
 Reconnaissance Battalion 33
 1st Abteilung of the 33rd Artillery Regiment
 33rd Panzerjäger Battalion (12  PaK 38 and 21  PaK 36 anti-tank guns)
 15th Motorcycle Battalion (Hauptmann Curt Ehle)
 One anti-aircraft battery (with 13  FlaK 18 and 36 anti-aircraft guns)
  5th Light Division
 Generalleutnant Johann von Ravenstein
 5th Panzer Regiment
 3rd Reconnaissance Battalion
  102nd Motorised Division "Trento"
 Generale di Divisione Luigi Nuvoloni
 Three infantry battalions and one artillery regiment (stationed at the Sollum-Musaid-Capuzzo area)
 Korps troops
 Two regiments Italian artillery (stationed at Bardia)
 One regiment FlaK (88 mm guns)

Notes

Bibliography
 
 
 

World War II orders of battle